Michael Paul Duffy (born 12 October 1994) is an Irish showjumper. Michael is currently the youngest Irish Senior Irish National Showjumping Champion. He started his career in Galway, Ireland under the training and Guidance of his father Paul Duffy , International Course builder and  former International Show-jumper.

Michael rode horses for Olympic Bronze Medalist Cian O'Connor whilst on UAE Tour before moving to West Sussex to ride alongside Irish rider Shane Breen.

References 

1994 births
Living people
Irish show jumping riders